Thomas Eddy Rongen (born 31 October 1956) is a Dutch American football coach who has spent the majority of his playing and coaching career in the United States. In December 2016, he was named Chief Scout of the United States Men's National Team. Rongen won the MLS Coach of the Year award in MLS's inaugural season in 1996, leading the Tampa Bay Mutiny to the best regular-season record.

Player 
Rongen began his playing career with Amsterdamsche FC, with whom he played as defensive midfielder and defender from 1973 to 1979.

In 1979, Rongen moved to the United States, joining the Los Angeles Aztecs of the North American Soccer League.  Rongen spent the entire 1979 season with the Aztecs.  He then began the 1980 season in Los Angeles.  On 12 July 1980, the Aztecs sold his contract to the Washington Diplomats.  The team folded at the end of the season and Rongen moved to the Fort Lauderdale Strikers where he would remain for the next three seasons.  In 1984, Joe Robbie, owner of the Strikers, moved the team to Minneapolis, Minnesota where it was renamed the Minnesota Strikers.  Rongen moved with the team and spent the 1984 outdoor season there.  The league collapsed at the end of the season.

The Strikers moved to the Major Indoor Soccer League for the 1984–1985 season.  On 22 May 1985, Rongen joined the South Florida Sun of the United Soccer League.  The league lasted six games, then collapsed.  In October 1985, Rongen signed as a free agent with the Chicago Sting of MISL.  At the end of the season, he moved to Florida to coach youth and high school soccer.  In 1987, he played for the Houston Dynamos of the Lone Star Soccer Alliance.  On 8 January 1988, he became the first player to sign with the Fort Lauderdale Strikers of the newly established American Soccer League.  He continued to play for the Strikers until 1993.

Coach 
Rongen began his coaching career as an assistant with the Pope John Paul II High School boys' team in 1984.  On 27 June 1986, he was named as head coach.  During his tenure coaching PJPII, he took the team to a 32–6–5 record and he was a two time Sun-Sentinel Coach of the Year.  He resigned from his position on 16 May 1988.  He also coached with the Plantation Eagles Soccer Club.  This led to his selection as coach of the Florida U-23 soccer team which defeated the United States men's national soccer team with goals from Zen Luzniak and Henry Gutierrez in an 8 March 1987 scrimmage.  Rongen also served as an assistant with the Nova Southeastern University men's soccer team.  In August 1988, he was hired to coach the South Plantation High School boys' team.

On 8 February 2004 he replaced Wim Suurbier as head coach of the Strikers.  He took the Strikers to the 1989 ASL title and then skippered the team to a victory over the San Diego Nomads in the national championship game.  He was the 1990 APSL Coach of the Year.  In August 1994, he resigned as head coach.  In November 1990, he replaced Hal Henderson as head coach of Nova Southeastern University. He coached the team for five seasons, compiling a 50–35–8 record.

Major League Soccer
Rongen was one of the inaugural coaches in MLS, coaching the Tampa Bay Mutiny in their first season in 1996, with whom he won the MLS regular season, and also won MLS Coach of the Year Award.  After a year with the Mutiny, Rongen moved to the New England Revolution, which he coaches in 1997 and 1998.  After the Revolution, Rongen succeeded Bruce Arena as the head coach of D.C. United, which he led to an MLS Cup in 1999.  However, Rongen lost his job with United in 2001, and was replaced with Ray Hudson.

National teams
Upon leaving United, Rongen was appointed head coach of the United States U-20 men's national soccer team, which he coached from 2001 to his appointment as head coach of Chivas USA for the team's inaugural season in 2005. However, ten games into the season, with the team's record standing at one win, one tie, and eight losses, he was let go of his head coaching duties.

Rongen was appointed head coach of the Under-20 United States men's national team again in 2006 and led the team to the 2007 FIFA U-20 World Cup and 2009 FIFA U-20 World Cup. He was fired from that position in May 2011 after the team failed to qualify for the World Cup.

In 2011, Rongen became the head coach of American Samoa. With Rongen at the helm, American Samoa registered its second ever victory on 22 November 2011, against Tonga, in the 2014 World Cup qualification. Under Rongen, American Samoa reached 173rd in the FIFA World Rankings. His work with the American Samoa team is at the center of the 2014 British documentary, Next Goal Wins and the upcoming film of the same name.

MLS and NASL
Rongen became director of TFC Academy prior to the 2012 season, joining countrymen Aron Winter and Bob de Klerk at Toronto FC.

He was named head coach of the Tampa Bay Rowdies in December 2014. Rongen was fired along with General Manager/President, Farrukh Quraishi on 21 August 2015.

In late 2016, Rongen was hired by Bruce Arena as the head international scout for the United States national team program.

Personal life
Rongen married Gail Megaloudis in 1996. He is stepfather to Gail's children with Nicky Megaloudis, Nicole and Chris. In 2004, Nicole died in a single car accident on I-64 West in Goochland County, Virginia, aged 19. Rongen wore his stepdaughter's baseball cap during American Samoa's win over Tonga, as shown in Next Goal Wins.

See also
 List of Major League Soccer coaches

References

External links 
 NASL/MISL stats

1956 births
Living people
American Professional Soccer League coaches
American Professional Soccer League players
American Soccer League (1988–89) coaches
American Soccer League (1988–89) players
Chicago Sting (MISL) players
Chivas USA coaches
D.C. United coaches
Dutch footballers
Dutch football managers
Dutch expatriate football managers
Expatriate soccer players in the United States
Expatriate soccer managers in the United States
Fort Lauderdale Strikers (1988–1994) players
Fort Lauderdale Strikers (1977–1983) players
Fort Lauderdale Sun players
Houston Dynamos players
Lone Star Soccer Alliance players
Los Angeles Aztecs players
Major League Soccer coaches
Major League Soccer executives
Minnesota Strikers (NASL) players
New England Revolution coaches
North American Soccer League (1968–1984) players
North American Soccer League (1968–1984) indoor players
Tampa Bay Mutiny coaches
Tampa Bay Rowdies coaches
United Soccer League (1984–85) players
Washington Diplomats (NASL) players
Footballers from Amsterdam
Expatriate football managers in American Samoa
American Samoa national football team managers
North American Soccer League coaches
Minnesota Strikers (MISL) players
Association football defenders
Association football midfielders
Dutch expatriates in American Samoa
United States men's national under-20 soccer team managers
High school soccer coaches in the United States